The 1989 NCAA Division I baseball tournament was played at the end of the 1989 NCAA Division I baseball season to determine the national champion of college baseball.  The tournament concluded with eight teams competing in the College World Series, a double-elimination tournament in its forty third year.  Eight regional competitions were held to determine the participants in the final event.  Each region was composed of six teams, resulting in 48 teams participating in the tournament at the conclusion of their regular season, and in some cases, after a conference tournament.  The forty-third tournament's champion was Wichita State, coached by Gene Stephenson.  The Most Outstanding Player was Greg Brummett of Wichita State.

Regionals
The opening rounds of the tournament were played across eight regional sites across the country, each consisting of a six-team field. Each regional tournament is double-elimination, however region brackets are variable depending on the number of teams remaining after each round. The winners of each regional advanced to the College World Series.

Bold indicates winner.

Atlantic Regional
at Tallahassee, FL

South Regional
at Starkville, MS

Northeast Regional
at Waterbury, CT

Central Regional
at College Station, TX

West I Regional
at Tucson, AZ

West II Regional
at Fresno, CA

Midwest Regional
at Austin, TX

East Regional
at Gainesville, FL

College World Series

Participants

Results
The teams in the CWS were divided into two pools of four, with each pool playing a double-elimination format. For the second time since the College World Series began in 1947, the series was not a true double elimination tournament. Instead, the winners of the two pools met in a single National Championship game. Texas came out of its pool with no losses. Wichita State came out of its pool with one loss. Wichita State defeated Texas in the Championship game. Because each team only had one loss, in the championships prior to 1988, the teams would have played a winner-take-all game for the championship. Therefore, when Texas lost the championship game, rather than play another game for the championship, Wichita State was crowned champion. This new format was adopted for television reasons for the final game. Later, the format was switched to a best of three series in 2003.

Bracket

Game results

All-Tournament Team
The following players were members of the All-Tournament Team.

Notable players
Arkansas: Bubba Carpenter, Mike Oquist, Scott Pose, Phil Stidham
Florida State: Chris Brock, Matt Dunbar, Gar Finnvold, Eduardo Pérez, Marc Ronan
Long Beach State: Kyle Abbott, Darrell Sherman, Tom Urbani, Dan Berthel
LSU: Paul Byrd, Curt Leskanic, Ben McDonald, John O'Donoghue, Chad Ogea, Keith Osik, Russ Springer
Miami (FL): Jorge Fábregas, Alex Fernández, Joe Grahe, Oscar Múñoz, F.P. Santangelo
North Carolina: Jim Dougherty, Jesse Levis, Brad Woodall
Texas: Kirk Dressendorfer, Shane Reynolds
Wichita State: Greg Brummett, P. J. Forbes, Tyler Green, Mike Lansing, Pat Meares, Eric Wedge
George Washington Colonials: John Flaherty

References

NCAA Division I Baseball Championship
1989 NCAA Division I baseball season
NCAA Division I Baseball
Baseball in Austin, Texas